Gentinnes is a village of Wallonia and district of the municipality of Chastre, located in the province of Walloon Brabant, Belgium.

References

Former municipalities of Walloon Brabant
Chastre